Spain competed at the 1928 Summer Olympics in Amsterdam, Netherlands. 80 competitors, all men, took part in 34 events in 10 sports.

Medalists

Athletics

Boxing

Men's Flyweight (– 50.8 kg)
 José Villanova Pueyo
 First round — Bye
 Second round — lost to Antal Kocsis (HUN), points

Cycling

One male cyclist represented Spain in 1928.

Sprint
 José Maria Yermo

Equestrian

Fencing

Nine fencers, all men, represented Spain in 1928.

Men's foil
 Domingo García
 Fernando García
 Armando Alemán

Men's team foil
 Diego Díez, Domingo García, Juan Delgado, Félix de Pomés, Fernando García

Men's épée
 Domingo García
 Francisco González

Men's team épée
 Juan Delgado, Domingo García, Diego Díez, Félix de Pomés, Francisco González

Men's sabre
 Isidro González
 Francisco González
 Juan Jesús García

Football

Hockey

Roster

 Group play

Sailing

Swimming

Water Polo

References

External links
Spanish Olympic Committee
Official Olympic Reports
International Olympic Committee results database

Nations at the 1928 Summer Olympics
1928
Oly